Rugby is a constituency represented in the House of Commons of the UK Parliament since its 2010 recreation by Mark Pawsey, a Conservative.

History
1885–1918: The Petty Sessional Divisions of Rugby, Southam, Burton Dassett and Kingston, and Kenilworth (except the parishes of Lillington and Milverton).

1918–1945: The Rural Districts of Farnborough, Monks Kirby, Rugby and Southam, the Rural District of Brailes (except the parishes of Ilmington and Stretton-on-Fosse), the parishes of Charlcote, Combrook, Compton Verney, Eatington, Kineton, Loxley, Moreton Morrell, Newbold Pacey, Wellesbourne Hastings and Wellesbourne Mountford in the Rural District of Stratford-on-Avon, and the Urban District of Rugby.

1945–1950:

1950–1974: The Municipal Borough of Rugby and the Rural District of Rugby.

1974–1983: The borough of Rugby and the rural district of Rugby as altered by The West Midlands Order 1965 and The Coventry Order 1965.

2010-: The Borough of Nuneaton and Bedworth ward of Bulkington, and the Borough of Rugby wards of Admirals, Avon and Swift, Benn, Bilton, Brownsover North, Brownsover South, Caldecott, Earl Craven and Wolston, Eastlands, Fosse, Hillmorton, Lawford and King's Newnham, New Bilton, Newbold, Overslade, Paddox, and Wolvey.

Between 1950 and 1979, Rugby was a consistent Labour-Conservative marginal, often bucking the national swing (for example, William Price held the seat for Labour with an increased majority in 1970 while the Wilson government was defeated). Since its recreation in 2010, the seat has produced solid Conservative majorities.

Boundaries
Historic boundaries
When first created in 1885, the Rugby division consisted of the Petty Sessional Divisions of Rugby, Southam, Burton Dassett and Kington, and Kenilworth except the parishes of Lillington and Milverton. The division as recommended by the Boundary Commissioners had a population of 49,291 in the 1881 Census.

Boundary changes in 1918 expanded the constituency to the south, while removing some areas near Leamington Spa. The constituency was defined as consisting of the Urban District of Rugby, the Rural Districts of Farnborough, Monks Kirby, Rugby and Southam, together with the majority of Brailes Rural district (excepting only the two parishes of Ilmington and Stretton-on-Fosse which were in a detached part of Warwickshire). Finally, the division included several parishes which were in the east of Stratford-on-Avon Rural District: Charlcote, Combrook, Compton Verney, Eatington, Kineton, Loxley, Moreton Morrell, Newbold Pacey, Wellesbourne Hastings and Wellesbourne Mountford.

When changes were made to constituency boundaries in 1945 to split up some extremely large constituencies, Rugby was affected by the recommendations made as a result of the growth in electorate in the Coventry constituency. It gained some areas to the east of Coventry which had already been added to Rugby Rural District but were previously part of Nuneaton division. This change added about 2,000 voters. The constituency was considerably reduced in area in boundary changes which came into effect in 1950, being reduced to simply the Municipal Borough of Rugby and the Rural District of Rugby. No alteration in boundaries was made as part of the First Periodical Review of Boundaries in 1954, and in the Second Periodical Review which came into effect in 1974, the definition remained the same although changes in local government boundaries meant that a minor change was made.

The Third Periodical Review of constituency boundaries expanded the Rugby constituency to the west. The constituency lost 6,545 of its 60,909 electors, in and around the villages of Ansty and Wolvey, to Nuneaton. It then gained 16,600 electors from Kenilworth, resulting in its renaming as Rugby and Kenilworth.

Current boundaries

Parliament accepted the Boundary Commission's Fifth Periodic Review of Westminster constituencies which slightly altered this constituency for the 2010 general election since which it has electoral wards:
Admirals; Avon and Swift; Benn; Bilton; Brownsover North; Brownsover South; Caldecott; Earl Craven and Wolston; Eastlands; Fosse; Hillmorton; Lawford and King's Newnham; New Bilton; Newbold; Overslade; Paddox; Wolvey. in Rugby Borough
Bulkington in the Borough of Nuneaton and Bedworth.

Constituency profile
The constituency consists of Census Output Areas of two local government districts with similar characteristics and that forming the bulk has a working population whose income is slightly above to the national average and lower than average reliance upon social housing.  At the end of 2012 the unemployment rate in the constituency stood as 2.3% of the population claiming jobseekers allowance, compared to the regional average of 4.4%.

The borough contributing to the bulk of the seat has a quite low 17.5% of its population without a car, 19.6% of the population without qualifications contrasted with a high 28.2% with level 4 qualifications or above by way of illustration.  In terms of tenure 69.5% of homes are owned outright or on a mortgage as at the 2011 census across the district.

Members of Parliament

MPs 1885–1983

MPs since 2010

Elections

Elections in the 2010s

Elections in the 1970s

Elections in the 1960s

Elections in the 1950s

Elections in the 1940s

General Election 1939–40:

Another general election was required to take place before the end of 1940. The political parties had been making preparations for an election to take place from 1939 and by the end of this year, the following candidates had been selected; 
Conservative: David Margesson
Liberal: M E Avery
Labour: A E Millett

Elections in the 1930s

Elections in the 1920s

Elections in the 1910s

Elections in the 1900s

Elections in the 1890s

Elections in the 1880s

See also
List of parliamentary constituencies in Warwickshire

Notes

References
Specific

General
Craig, F. W. S. (1983). British parliamentary election results 1918-1949 (3 ed.). Chichester: Parliamentary Research Services. .

External links
Catalogue of the Rugby Constituency Labour Party archives, held at the Modern Records Centre, University of Warwick

Borough of Rugby
Parliamentary constituencies in Warwickshire
Constituencies of the Parliament of the United Kingdom established in 1885
Constituencies of the Parliament of the United Kingdom disestablished in 1983
Constituencies of the Parliament of the United Kingdom established in 2010